Carmine Giorgi (16 October 1910 – 1 February 1965) was a Brazilian athlete. He competed in the men's hammer throw at the 1932 Summer Olympics.

References

External links
 

1910 births
1965 deaths
Athletes (track and field) at the 1932 Summer Olympics
Brazilian male hammer throwers
Olympic athletes of Brazil
Athletes from São Paulo